This list of sites on the National Register of Historic Parks and Gardens is a list of parks and gardens in England featured on the Register of Historic Parks and Gardens of special historic interest in England.  The list is managed by Historic England (formerly English Heritage), and currently includes about 1,600 sites.

As with listed buildings, parks and gardens are graded on a scale: Grade I being internationally significant sites; these are therefore the most important and constitute around 10% of the total number.  Historically important gardens are Grade II* (about 30% of the total), and the remainder are of regional or national importance and are Grade II registered.  As with listed buildings, Registered Parks and Gardens can be searched on the National Heritage List for England (NHLE) website.

Provided at the end of this page are those sites which were formerly listed, but have since been delisted.

Lists by region
Listed parks and gardens in the East Midlands
Listed parks and gardens in the East of England
Listed parks and gardens in Greater London
Listed parks and gardens in North East England
Listed parks and gardens in North West England
Listed parks and gardens in South East England
Listed parks and gardens in South West England
Listed parks and gardens in the West Midlands
Listed parks and gardens in Yorkshire and the Humber

The sites (alphabetical)

Parks and gardens

A la Ronde, Devon – Grade II
Abberley Hall, Worcestershire – Grade II
Addington Park, London – Grade II
Alexandra Park, Manchester – Grade II
Arley House, Worcestershire – Grade II
Bagthorpe Gardens, Nottingham – Grade II*
Barrington Court, Somerset – Grade II*
Barrow Park, Barrow-in-Furness – Grade II
Birmingham Botanical Gardens, West Midlands – Grade II*
Boultham Park, Lincoln – Grade II
Bridge End Gardens, Saffron Walden – Grade II*
Broadway, Letchworth –  Grade II
Burslem Park, Stoke-on-Trent – Grade II*
Canons Park, London – Grade II
Castle Park, Frodsham, Cheshire – Grade II
Catton Park, Norwich – Grade II*
Caversham Court, Reading – Grade II
Caversham Park, Reading – Grade II 
Chantry Park, Ipswich – Grade II (No.1000271)
Cholmondeley Castle, Cheshire – Grade II
Clevedon Court, Somerset – Grade II*
Cliveden, Buckinghamshire - Grade I
Corporation Park, Blackburn – Grade II
Cotehele, Cornwall – Grade II*
Cothelstone Manor, Somerset – Grade II
The Courts Garden, Wiltshire – Grade II
Crewe Hall, Cheshire – Grade II
Croxteth Hall, Liverpool – Grade II
Crystal Palace, London – Grade II
Cumberland Lodge, Berkshire - Grade I
Derby Arboretum, Derby – Grade II*
Dolphin Square, London – Grade II
Dulwich Park, London – Grade II
Dunorlan Park, Kent – Grade II
East Lambrook Manor, Somerset – Grade I
Easton Lodge Gardens, Essex – Grade II
Eaton Hall, Cheshire – Grade II*
Englefield House, Berkshire - Grade II
Exbury Gardens, Hampshire - Grade II*
Forbury Gardens, Reading – Grade II
Frogmore, Berkshire - Grade I
Hanley Park, Stoke-on-Trent – Grade II*
Hartsholme Country Park, Lincoln – Grade II
Hazlegrove House Park and Garden, Somerset - Grade II
Hedsor House, Buckinghamshire – Grade II
Heights of Abraham, Derbyshire – Grade II* 
Herstmonceux Castle, Sussex – Grade II* 
Hestercombe House, Somerset – Grade I
Hill Close Gardens, Warwick – Grade II*
Holwood House, London – Grade II
Howard Park and Gardens, Letchworth – Grade II
Iford Manor, Wiltshire - Grade I
Kelston Park, Somerset – Grade II*
Knebworth House, Hertforshire – Grade II*
Larmer Tree Gardens, Wiltshire – Grade II*
Layer Marney Tower, Essex – Grade II
Leonardslee, Sussex – Grade I
Lincoln Arboretum, Lincoln – Grade II
Lyme Park, Cheshire – Grade II*
Lytes Cary, Somerset – Grade II
Marston House, Somerset – Grade II
Milton Lodge, Somerset – Grade II
Mote Park, Kent – Grade II
Mount Edgcumbe House, Cornwall – Grade I
Newsham Park, Liverpool – Grade II
Nymans, West Sussex – Grade II*
Orchardleigh Estate, Somerset – Grade II*
Oldbury Court Estate, Bristol – Grade II
Plumpton Rocks, North Yorkshire - Grade II*
Orpington Priory Gardens, London – Grade II 
Owlpen Manor, Gloucestershire – Grade II
Peover Hall, Cheshire – Grade II
Poundisford Park, Somerset – Grade II
Port Eliot, Cornwall - Grade I
Porter Valley Parks, Sheffield – Grade II
Prideaux Place, Cornwall – Grade II
Prior Park Landscape Garden, Bath – Grade I
Priory Park, Dudley – Grade II
Prospect Park, Reading – Grade II
The Quarry, Shrewsbury – Grade II
Renishaw Hall, Derbyshire – Grade II*
Richmond Hill Terrace Gardens, London – Grade II*
Royal Hospital Chelsea, London - Grade II
Royal Victoria Park, Bath – Grade II
Salle Park, Norfolk – Grade II
St Ann's Allotments, Nottingham – Grade II*
St Paul's Walden Bury, Hertfordshire – Grade I
St Michael's Mount, Cornwall – Grade II
Stamford Park, Altrincham – Grade II
Stanley Park, Liverpool – Grade II
Stanmer Park, Sussex – Grade II
Stoke Park, Northamptonshire – Grade II
Stoke Poges Memorial Gardens, Buckinghamshire - Grade I
Stoney Road Allotments, Coventry – Grade II*
Stowe Landscape Gardens, Buckinghamshire - Grade I
Sydney Gardens, Bath – Grade II
Tabley House, Cheshire – Grade II
Tatton Park Gardens, Cheshire – Grade II*
Tintinhull Garden, Somerset – Grade II
Trent Park, London – Grade II
Turvey House and Gardens, Bedfordshire – Grade II
Valentines Park, London – Grade II
Victoria Park, Leicester – Grade II
Victoria Park, London - Grade II*
Waddesdon Manor, Buckinghamshire - Grade I
Walpole Park, London – Grade II
Wandsworth Park, London – Grade II
Wanstead Park, London – Grade II*
Warley Woods, West Midlands – Grade II
Wavertree Botanic Park and Gardens, Liverpool – Grade II
West Park, Wolverhampton – Grade II*
West Wycombe Park, Buckinghamshire - Grade I
Westbourne Road Town Gardens, Birmingham – Grade II
Westonbirt Arboretum, Gloucestershire - Grade I
 Wightwick Manor, West Midlands – Grade II
Wimpole Estate, Cambridgeshire - Grade I

Cemeteries

The total number of cemeteries included on the Register is around 110.  These include:
Abney Park Cemetery, Stoke Newington – Grade II
Allerton Cemetery, Liverpool – Grade II
American Military Cemetery, Cambridge – Grade II
Anfield Cemetery, Liverpool – Grade II
Arnos Vale Cemetery, Bristol – Grade II
Bath Abbey Cemetery, Bath – Grade II*
Beckett Street Cemetery, Leeds – Grade II*
Brompton Cemetery, London – Grade II*
Brookwood Cemetery, Surrey – Grade I
City of London Cemetery, London – Grade II
Golders Green Crematorium, London – Grade II
Grove Park Cemetery, London – Grade II
Highgate Cemetery, London – Grade II*
Kensal Green Cemetery, London – Grade II*
Key Hill Cemetery, Birmingham – Grade II
Nunhead Cemetery, London, formerly known as All Saints – Grade II*
Old & New Cemeteries, Ipswich – Grade II*
Reading Old Cemetery, Reading – Grade II
Sheffield General Cemetery, Sheffield – Grade II
Toxteth Park Cemetery, Liverpool – Grade II
Undercliffe Cemetery, Bradford – Grade II
West Norwood Cemetery, London, formerly known as The South Metropolitan Cemetery – Grade II*

Delisted sites

Philips Park, Bury – delisted 1999

References

External links
Parks and Gardens Selection Guides – gives detailed criteria for inclusion

Heritage registers in England